is a former Japanese football player who is currently a football referee.

Club statistics

References

External links

spcom.co.jp

1979 births
Living people
Fukuyama University alumni
Association football people from Fukuoka Prefecture
Japanese footballers
J2 League players
Japan Football League players
Tokushima Vortis players
Sagawa Shiga FC players
Ehime FC players
SP Kyoto FC players
Association football forwards